Diprophylline (INN) or dyphylline (USAN) (trade names Dilor, Lufyllin), is a xanthine derivative with bronchodilator and vasodilator effects. It is used in the treatment of respiratory disorders like asthma, cardiac dyspnea, and bronchitis. It acts as an adenosine receptor antagonist and phosphodiesterase inhibitor.

See also 
 Xanthine

References 

Adenosine receptor antagonists
Diols
Phosphodiesterase inhibitors
Xanthines